The 1950 British Grand Prix, formally known as The Royal Automobile Club Grand Prix d'Europe Incorporating The British Grand Prix, was a Formula One motor race held on 13 May 1950 at the Silverstone Circuit in Silverstone, England. It was the first World Championship Formula One race, as well as the fifth British Grand Prix, and the third to be held at Silverstone after motor racing resumed after World War II. It was the first race of seven in the 1950 World Championship of Drivers.

The 70-lap race was won by Nino Farina for the Alfa Romeo team, after starting from pole position, with a race time of 2:13:23.6 and an average speed of 146.378 km/h. Luigi Fagioli finished second in another Alfa Romeo, and Reg Parnell third in a third Alfa Romeo.

The race followed the non-championship Pau Grand Prix and San Remo Grand Prix (both won by Juan Manuel Fangio), the Richmond Trophy (won by Reg Parnell) and the Paris Grand Prix (won by Georges Grignard).

Background

The formation of Formula One was created in 1946 with the first race under the Formula rules being the 1946 Turin Grand Prix which was won by Achille Varzi in the Alfa Romeo 158. But it wouldn't be until the 1949 when the Fédération Internationale de l'Automobile announce a series that would take place the following year, one year after the formation of the Grand Prix motorcycle racing.

The 1950 edition of the British Grand Prix was the fifth edition of the Grand Prix with it also being the third time that Silverstone Circuit held since the first race being held in 1948. It was also the designated European Grand Prix for the year, which was the 11th time that title had been held since the first one back in 1923. Before the first Grand Prix which was held, four non-championship races was held all across Europe with Juan Manuel Fangio winning the races in Pau and San Remo with the other two races being won by Reg Parnell and Georges Grignard.

During the weekend, the race was also supported by an International 500cc race which was won by Stirling Moss driving a Cooper-JAP. There was also a demonstration run for the much-anticipated BRM P15, which was due to enter the sport later in the year. The race was attended by George VI, Queen Elizabeth, Princess Margaret, and the Earl & Countess Mountbatten of Burma.

Entries

24 drivers were entered for the first race with them competing in 22 different cars. The numbers 7 and 13 were not assigned. The biggest absence was the Scuderia Ferrari who wouldn't compete in the opening race with Enzo Ferrari not sending any cars to Britain with the team debuting at the next round in Monaco. This meant that Alfa Romeo with four drivers for Farina, Fangio, Fagioli and British driver, Reg Parnell. Their main competition was the Maseratis, of Scuderia Ambrosiana and their drivers, David Hampshire and David Murray. Enrico Platé also entered two Maserati's with Prince Bira of Siam and Baron Toulo de Graffenried with the pair not being able to practice on Thursday. Felice Bonetto also entered in a Maserati but wouldn't arrive for the race.

Talbot-Lago sent over two factory cars in the traditional French pale blue colour to be driven by Yves Giraud-Cabantous and Eugène Martin. Other private Talbots were entered by Louis Rosier, Philippe Etancelin and Belgian Johnny Claes, in a yellow car. The rest of the field was made up of local machinery, which included four E.R.A.s and two Altas, in British racing green.

 – Luigi Fagioli qualified and drove all 70 laps of the race in the #3 Alfa Romeo. Gianbattista Guidotti, named substitute driver for the car, was not used at the Grand Prix.
 – Peter Walker qualified and drove 2 laps of the race in the #9 ERA. Tony Rolt took over the car for 3 laps of the race.
 – Joe Fry qualified and drove 45 laps of the race in the #10 Maserati. Brian Shawe-Taylor took over the car for 19 laps of the race.
 – Entry cancelled prior to event.

Qualifying
Qualifying took place on the Friday and saw the Alfa Romeo's ended up on the front row of the grid as Farina claim the first pole position in the history of Formula One with a time of 1:50.8. Fagioli and Fangio and Parnell would fill the remaining spots on the front row of the grid. Prince Bira was the fastest non-Alfa, 1.8 seconds back with the two Talbot's cars filling in the second row.

Qualifying classification

Race
On 13 May, 21 drivers from 9 countries were represented at the old Silverstone airport, 4 from France, 2 from Italy, 1 each from Belgium, Ireland, Monaco, Argentina, Thailand and Switzerland. The UK was represented by 9 drivers. The race drew 200,000 spectators. At the start of the race, Farina took the lead with Fagioli and Fangio in pursuit, while Cabantous got a poor start and lost 4 positions. In the early laps they switched around between themselves several times to keep everyone amused. Fangio retired with engine troubles caused by a broken oil pipe and so Farina led Fagioli home by 2.5 seconds with Parnell a distant third despite hitting a hare during the race. The nearest challenger was Giraud-Cabantous two laps down, Bira having retired with a fuel problem. Crossley and Murray duelled at the back before retiring, de Graffenried had done so on lap 34, while Chiron was demoted to the role of viewer 10 laps earlier. Nino Farina led for 63 laps (1–9, 16–37 and 39–70). Luigi Fagioli led for 6 laps (10–15). Juan Manuel Fangio led for 1 lap (38). Joe Fry drove car #10 for the first 45 laps, then Brian Shawe-Taylor took over for 19 laps for a total 64 laps, distance 297.536 km. Peter Walker drove car #9 for 2 laps, then Tony Rolt drove for and additional 3 laps, totaling 5 laps, a distance of 23.245 km. Nino Farina achieved the fastest lap of the race, with a 1:50.6 on Lap 2.

Race classification

Notes
 – Includes 1 point for fastest lap

Championship standings after the race
Drivers' Championship standings

 Note: Only the top five positions are listed. Only the best 4 results counted towards the Championship.

References

External links
BBC newsreel of the event

British
British Grand Prix
European Grand Prix
Grand Prix
May 1950 sports events in the United Kingdom